Thirst is the thirteenth studio album by German thrash metal band Tankard, released on 19 December 2008. The limited edition of this album was sold with a bonus DVD.

Track listing

Reception

Personnel
Andreas "Gerre" Geremia - vocals
Andy Gutjahr - guitar
Frank Thorwarth - bass, backing vocals
Olaf Zissel - drums

References 

2008 albums
Tankard (band) albums
AFM Records albums
Albums produced by Andy Classen